The Neo Geo Pocket Color is a  handheld video game console released by SNK in 1999.

Games
There are currently  games on this list. Games that can be played on the monochrome Neo Geo Pocket are noted as backwards compatible.

Notes

External links
Complete NGPC Masterlist

Neo Geo Pocket Color